Thomas Eccleston may refer to:

Thomas Eccleston (Jesuit) (1659–1743), English Jesuit
Thomas of Eccleston, 13th-century English Franciscan chronicler